The Boxing Tournament at the 1993 Central American and Caribbean Games was held in Ponce, Puerto Rico from November 20 to November 28, 1993.

Medal winners

References
Amateur Boxing

C
1993 Central American and Caribbean Games
Boxing at the Central American and Caribbean Games